Kim Jeong-tae (Hangul: 김정태; born January 11, 1985), better known by the mononym J'Kyun (Hangul: 제이켠), is a South Korean rapper and singer.

Career
Kim first entered the hip-hop scene in 2003, under the name Jung Kyun. After dropping out of Dongguk University he joined a hip-hop crew known as Diamond Tribe with members: JuNi, Freestarr, LEGO, and Marco and Lugar of Mo'Real, who performed frequently at Club Belly in Apgujeong-dong. He began work on his debut album in the Summer of 2003, with producers: Marco and Lee-ryung. The extended play, Just Clap, was finally released in November 2005.

In 2008, Kim officially changed his stage name to J'Kyun after his Diss track directed at San E went viral. His activities began to gain more attention when he joined the music group, Romantic City and produced lyrics under the name Rocy. He withdrew from the group in late 2010 just before the release of a new album. Shortly after this he became part of a group by the name Fresh Boyz, composed of members: Ceejay, Nolbu, Kwon Sa-jang and himself, although he left the group in mid 2011 for personal reasons.

In early 2010 J'Kyun announced that he had signed with BigDeal Records, where he went on to release his first studio album Re Birthday in May of the same year. Some songs on the album, namely "Mom" and "Back Then" were inspired by his mother, who had recently died. While the track "I Go" became known controversially, with negative lyrics surrounding big companies such as YG Entertainment, SM Entertainment and JYP Entertainment. In October J'Kyun announced that he had decided to leave Bigdeal Records, and that he was involved in a project with vocalist Kuan, currently preparing an underground EP. The project team began activities in November 2010 under the name Louis.B and released two digital singles.

In 2011, after J'Kyun had parted ways with Romantic City and Fresh Boyz, he joined Brand New Music where he began preparing a new album, but later left the label in 2012 and moved to Romantic Factory (a subordinate of Romantic City). Here he performed an internet radio show, "Ladies Radio", through his Facebook page, he used this platform to release songs that he had personally worked on, in particular, "Fantastic Soonkyu" and "Twinkle Soonkyu" which expressed affection towards Sunny of Girls Generation.

In April 2012, J'Kyun released his second extended play These Days including the single "Hot MC" featuring Zico of Block B, the EP peaked at number 70 on the Gaon Chart. In May he was selected as the Korean representative of the global music jacket, "Music Matters" in Singapore.

In 2013, he participated in Mnet's Show Me the Money 2 as a contestant, starting as a "Meta Crew" member, but later joining the "D.O. Crew" before finally being eliminated in the later stages.

In 2014, J'Kyun joined YMC Entertainment where he, Jessi and J-Yo formed Lucky J. The group released two singles and featured in an official drama soundtrack before disbanding in August 2016.

In 2019, he participated again in Show Me The Money 8 as the masked rapper, Cox Billy. He was eliminated from the show during the 1:1 crew battle against Mckdaddy.

Discography

Studio albums

Extended plays

Singles

Collaborations

Filmography

Television

References

External links

1985 births
Living people
South Korean male rappers
South Korean hip hop singers
21st-century South Korean male singers
Dongguk University alumni
Brand New Music artists